Sebastian Musiolik (born 19 May 1996) is a Polish professional footballer who plays as a striker for Raków Częstochowa.

Club career

On 1 October 2020 he joined Italian Serie B club Pordenone on loan.

Honours

Club
Raków Częstochowa
Polish Cup: 2020–21, 2021–22
 Polish Super Cup: 2021, 2022

References

External links
 
 

1996 births
People from Knurów
Sportspeople from Silesian Voivodeship
Living people
Association football forwards
Polish footballers
Poland youth international footballers
Piast Gliwice players
Raków Częstochowa players
Pordenone Calcio players
Ekstraklasa players
I liga players
II liga players
Serie B players
Polish expatriate footballers
Expatriate footballers in Italy